Acetylenediol, or ethynediol, is a chemical substance with formula HO−C≡C−OH (an ynol).  It is the diol of acetylene.  Acetylenediol is unstable in the condensed phase, although its tautomer glyoxal (CHO)2 is well known.

Detection
Acetylenediol was first observed in the gas-phase by mass spectrometry.

Derivatives

Alkoxide derivatives
Like the diol, most simple ether derivatives are labile.  Di-tert-butoxyacetylene is however a distillable liquid.

Acetylenediolate salts
Salts of the acetylenediolate (ethynediolate) dianion −O−C≡C−O− are known. They are not however prepared from ethynediol, but by the reduction of carbon monoxide.  Potassium acetylenediolate (K2C2O2) was first obtained by Liebig in 1834, from the reaction of carbon monoxide with metallic potassium; but for a long time the product was assumed to be "potassium carbonyl" (KCO).  Over the next 130 years were described the "carbonyls" of sodium (Johannis, 1893), barium (Gunz and Mentrel, 1903), strontium (Roederer, 1906), and lithium, rubidium, and caesium (Pearson, 1933). The reaction was eventually shown to yield a mixture of the potassium acetylenediolate  and potassium benzenehexolate .

The structure of these salts was clarified only in 1963 by Büchner and Weiss.

Acetylenediolates can also be prepared by the rapid reaction of CO and a solution of the corresponding metal in liquid ammonia at low temperature. Potassium acetylenediolate is a pale yellow solid that reacts explosively with air, halogens, halogenated hydrocarbons, alcohols, water, and any substance which possesses an acidic hydrogen.

Coordination complexes
Acetylenediol can form coordination compounds, such as [TaH(HOC≡COH)(dmpe)2Cl]+Cl− where dmpe is bis(dimethylphosphino)ethane.

Acetylenediolate and related anions such as deltate  and squarate  have been obtained from carbon monoxide under mild conditions by reductive coupling of CO  ligands in organouranium complexes.

See also
Acetylenedicarboxylic acid
Ethynol
Ynol

References

Alkyne derivatives
Alkynols
Diols
Organic compounds with 2 carbon atoms